Austroroccella is a single-species genus in the family Roccellaceae. It contains Austroroccella gayana, a saxicolous (rock-dwelling), fruticose lichen. This lichen produces dark to black s lacking pruina, and it contains roccellic acid as its only lichen product. The genus was circumscribed in 2013 by Anders Tehler, Martin Irestedt, and Damien Ertz based on molecular phylogenetic analysis that showed that the species belongs in an isolated clade in the Roccellaceae along with Dendrographa, Syncesia, and Roccellina.

References

Roccellaceae
Lichen genera
Taxa described in 2013
Arthoniomycetes genera